Juan Fernández Temiño (died 9 November 1556) was a Roman Catholic prelate who served as Bishop of León (1546–1556).

Biography
On 19 July 1546, Juan Fernández Temiño was appointed during the papacy of Pope Paul III as Bishop of León. On 10 October 1546, he was consecrated bishop. He served as Bishop of León until his death on 9 November 1556.

References

External links and additional sources
 (for Chronology of Bishops) 
 (for Chronology of Bishops) 

16th-century Roman Catholic bishops in Spain
1556 deaths
Bishops appointed by Pope Paul III